The Bristol Lucifer was a British three-cylinder, air-cooled, radial engine for aircraft. Built in the UK in the 1920s by the Bristol Aeroplane Company, it produced 100 horsepower (75 kW).

The Lucifer was originally a Cosmos Engineering engine, Cosmos being taken over by Bristol in 1920.

Applications
Albatros L 69
Avro 504
Boulton Paul P.10
Bristol M.1D
Bristol Primary Trainer
Bryant 1927 monoplane (Dole Race entrant, christened Angel of Los Angeles)
Handley Page Hamlet
LFG V 44
NVI F.K.29
Parnall Peto
Tupolev ANT-2
Udet U 8

Specifications (Lucifer 1)

See also

References

Notes

Bibliography

 Lumsden, Alec. British Piston Engines and their Aircraft. Marlborough, Wiltshire: Airlife Publishing, 2003. .

Aircraft air-cooled radial piston engines
Lucifer
1910s aircraft piston engines